The 1971 World Table Tennis Championships – Corbillon Cup (women's team) was the 24th edition of the women's team championship.

Japan won the gold medal, China won the silver medal and South Korea won the bronze medal.

Medalists

Second stage

Final tables

Group A

Group B

Third-place playoff

Final

See also
List of World Table Tennis Championships medalists

References

-
1971 in women's table tennis